The 2001–02 English Hockey League season took place from September 2001 until May 2002.

The men's title was won by Reading with the women's title going to Slough. There were no playoffs to determine champions after the regular season but there was a competition for the top four clubs called the Premiership tournament which culminated with men's & women's finals on 6 May.

The Men's Cup was won by Cannock and the Women's Cup was won by Ipswich.

Men's Premier Division League Standings

Women's Premier Division League Standings

Men's Premiership Tournament

Women's Premiership Tournament

Men's Cup (EHA Cup)

Quarter-finals

Semi-finals

Final 
(Held at the National Hockey Stadium (Milton Keynes) on 7 April)

Scorers
Ben Sharpe (3), Craig Parnham, Andy Humphrey, Simon Ramsden, Matt Taylor

Women's Cup (EHA Cup)

Quarter-finals

Semi-finals

Final 
(Held at National Hockey Stadium (Milton Keynes) on 7 April)

Scorers
Leisa King (3)

References 

2001
field hockey
field hockey
2002 in field hockey
2001 in field hockey